Kevin "The Soul Assassin" Ross (born July 27, 1980) is an American retired Muay Thai fighter and former mixed martial artist (one pro fight). He is also a former Bellator Kickboxing Featherweight champion. Among Kevin’s achievements so far are the Super light weight (140 pounds) WBC International championship Title, the Welterweight (147 pounds) WBC USA National championship Title, the FIDAM Welterweight championship of Mexico and the United States Muay Thai Federation Welterweight champion.           He currently trains at Combat Sports Academy in Dublin, California.

Biography and career

Kevin was born in Reading, Pennsylvania. Moving to Las Vegas in 1994, he started training in Muay Thai in 2003 under famous Muay Thai trainer Master Toddy. Kevin, trained in Thailand numerous times most recently with Sitmonchai gym in Thamaka, Thailand while fighting in the 2010 Toyota Cup 8-man tournament. In December 2010 Ross was Voted Muay Thai North American Fighter of the year. He has fought some of the best Thai boxers in the world and holds a 2–3 record against Thais. With his losses coming to Kongla, Saenchai, and Sitisak, and his wins to Coke and Malaipet.

In December 2012, Ross signed with the Glory promotion.

Returning from a torn ACL, he beat Chris Kwiatkowski by unanimous decision at Lion Fight 8 on January 25, 2013, in Las Vegas. Ross defeated UK champion Bernie Mendieta via split decision at Lion Fight 9 in Las Vegas on March 15, 2013. He was expected in the eight-man, 65 kg tournament at Glory 8: Tokyo - 65kg Slam in Tokyo, Japan on May 3, 2013 but pulled out due to contractual obligations to Lion Fight.

He lost to Matt Embree by unanimous decision at Lion Fight 10 in Las Vegas on July 26, 2013. He lost to Tetsuya Yamato by split decision at Lion Fight 11 in Las Vegas on September 20, 2013. He fought Matt Embree for the second time at Lion Fight 13 in Las Vegas on February 7, 2014, and continued his trend of having never lost a rematch by taking a split decision. Ross beat Chris Mauceri via TKO (cut) in round three at Lion Fight 15 in Ledyard, Connecticut on May 23, 2014. He defeated Michael Thompson via unanimous decision for the inaugural Lion Fight Super Lightweight Championship at Lion Fight 16 in Las Vegas on July 4, 2014.

Ross announced his retirement from competition, following a loss to Asa Ten Pow at TRIUMPHANT 11.

Notable fights

 Unanimous win Over former Rajadamnern Stadium Champion Malaipet “The Diamond” Sasiprapa.
 KO of former WBC International Super Lightweight Champion Kang En, August 30, 2009, winning the WBC Super-Lightweight Title.
 TKO victory of Justin Greskiewicz, July 22, 2009, to take the WBC USA Welterweight title.
 Unanimous win over Chike Lindsay-Adjuda December 5, 2009, Defending WBC USA Welterweight title.
 Unanimous decision win over Phanuwat "Coke" Chunhawat to earn the USMF National Pro Muaythai title Saturday October 10, 2009
On October 23, 2011, he lost against Sagetdao Petpayathai in the Muay Thai World Super Lightweight title fight, in Los Angeles, California

Titles
Bellator Kickboxing
Bellator Kickboxing Featherweight Championship (One time)
WBC Muaythai
2009 WBC Muaythai USA 66.7 kg Welterweight Championship. (1 defence)
2009 WBC Muaythai International 63.5 kg Super Lightweight Championship. (1 defence)
Federación Internacional de Artes Marciales
2008 FIDAM International Welterweight Championship.
United States Muaythai Federation
2009 USMF Pro. National Welterweight Championship.
Lion Fight
2014 Lion Fight Super Lightweight Championship.
World Muaythai Council
2015 WMC Intercontinental 63.5 kg Junior Welterweight Championship

Kickboxing record

|-  style="background:#fbb;"
| 2021-06-12 || Loss ||align=left| Asa Ten Pow || TRIUMPHANT 11 || Miami, USA || TKO (Doctor Stoppage) || 3 ||
|-  bgcolor="#FFBBBB"
| 2019-10-12|| Loss||align=left| Shan Cangelosi|| Bellator Kickboxing 12|| Milan, Italy || Decision (Unanimous) || 3 || 3:00
|-  bgcolor="#fbb"
| 2018-07-14|| Loss||align=left| Gabriel Varga|| Bellator Kickboxing 10 : Rome|| Rome, Italy || TKO (Ref. Stoppage/Punches) || 1 || 2:08
|-
! style=background:white colspan=9 |
|-  bgcolor="#FFBBBB"
|2017-12-9 || Loss ||align=left| Hamza Imane || Bellator Kickboxing 8 || Florence, Italy || Decision (split)  || 3 || 3:00
|-
|-  bgcolor="#CCFFCC"
| 2017-09-23 || Win ||align=left| Domenico Lomurno || Bellator Kickboxing 7 || San Jose, California || Decision (split)  || 5 || 3:00
|-
! style=background:white colspan=9 |
|-
|-  bgcolor="#CCFFCC"
| 2016-12-10 || Win ||align=left| Alessio Arduini   || Bellator Kickboxing 4|| Florence, Italy || KO (head kick)  || 2 || 0:42
|-
|-  bgcolor="#CCFFCC"
| 2016-06-24 || Win ||align=left| Justin Houghton || Bellator Kickboxing 2 || St. Louis, MO || Decision (unanimous) || 3 || 3:00
|-  bgcolor="#CCFFCC"
| 2016-04-15 || Win ||align=left| Matteo Taccini || Bellator Kickboxing 1 || Torino, Italy || Decision (unanimous) || 3 || 3:00
|-  bgcolor="#FFBBBB"
| 2015-07-31 || Loss ||align=left| Rungrat Sasiprapa || Lion Fight 23 || Temecula, CA || TKO (knee) || 2 || 2:13
|-  bgcolor="#FFBBBB"
| 2015-03-27 || Loss ||align=left| Tetsuya Yamato || Lion Fight 21 || Temecula, CA || TKO (Elbows) || 1 || 2:43
|-
! style=background:white colspan=9 |
|-
|- 
|-  bgcolor="#c5d2ea"
| 2014-11-30|| No Contest||align=left| Michihiro Omigawa || SHOOT BOXING WORLD TOURNAMENT S-cup 2014, Quarter Final || Tokyo, Japan || Doctor Stoppage || 2 ||
|-  bgcolor="#CCFFCC"
| 2014-07-04 || Win ||align=left| Michael Thompson || Lion Fight 16 || Las Vegas, Nevada, US || Decision (unanimous) || 5 || 3:00
|-
! style=background:white colspan=9 |
|-
|-  bgcolor="#CCFFCC"
| 2014-05-23 || Win ||align=left| Chris Mauceri || Lion Fight 15 || Mashantucket, Connecticut, US || TKO (cut) || 3 || 0:21
|-
|-  bgcolor="#CCFFCC"
| 2014-02-07 || Win ||align=left| Matt Embree || Lion Fight 13 || Las Vegas, NV || Decision (split) || 5 || 3:00
|-  bgcolor="#FFBBBB"
| 2013-09-20 || Loss ||align=left| Tetsuya Yamato || Lion Fight 11 || Las Vegas, NV || Decision (split) || 5 || 3:00
|-  bgcolor="#FFBBBB"
| 2013-07-26 || Loss ||align=left| Matt Embree || Lion Fight 10 || Las Vegas, NV || Decision (unanimous) || 5 || 3:00
|-  bgcolor="#CCFFCC"
| 2013-03-15 || Win ||align=left| Bernie Mendieta || Lion Fight 9 || Las Vegas, NV || Decision (split) || 5 || 3:00 
|-  bgcolor="#CCFFCC"
| 2013-01-25 || Win ||align=left| Chris Kwiatkowski || Lion Fight 8 || Las Vegas, NV || Decision (unanimous) || 6 || 3:00 
|-  bgcolor="#FFBBBB"
| 2011-10-21 ||loss  ||align=left| Sagetdao Petpayathai || M1 Grand Muay Thai, Nokia Theatre || Los Angeles, CA || TKO Cut Stoppage || 3 || 3:00
|-  bgcolor="#FFBBBB"
| 2011-08-13 ||loss  ||align=left| Saenchai Sinbimuaythai || World Class Championship Muay Thai, Anaheim Convention Center || Anaheim, CA ||Decision  ||5  || 3.00
|-  bgcolor="#CCFFCC"
| 2011-05-14 || Win ||align=left| Mark DeLuca || Battle in the Desert II, Buffalo Bills Casino || Las Vegas, NV, US || TKO (Doctor stoppage/cut) || 2 || 3:00
|-
! style=background:white colspan=9 |
|- 
|-  bgcolor="#FFBBBB"
| 2011-02-12 || Loss ||align=left| Sittisak Por Sirichai || Battle in the Desert, Buffalo Bills Casino || Las Vegas, NV, US || Decision (Split) || 5 || 3:00
|-  bgcolor="#CCFFCC"
| 2010-12-05 || Win ||align=left| Malaipet || King's Birthday Celebration, Commerce Casino || Los Angeles, CA || Decision (Unanimous) || 5 || 3:00 
|-  style="background:#FFBBBB"
| 2010-07-02 || Loss ||align=left| Masoud Izzadi || Toyota Cup 2010 Tournament, semi final || Nakhon Pathom, Thailand || Decision || 3 || 3:00
|-  style="background:#cfc;"
| 2010-07-02 || Win ||align=left|  || Toyota Cup 2010 Tournament, quarter final || Nakhon Pathom, Thailand || Decision || 3 || 3:00
|-  bgcolor="#CCFFCC"
| 2009-12-05 || Win ||align=left| Chike Lindsay || WCK World Championship Muay Thai, Buffalo Bills Casino || Primm, NV || Decision (Unanimous) || 5 || 3:00
|-
! style=background:white colspan=9 |
|-
|-  bgcolor="#CCFFCC"
| 2009-10-10 || Win ||align=left| Coke Chunhawat || War of the Heroes IV || Santa Clara, CA || Decision (Unanimous) || 5 || 3:00
|-
! style=background:white colspan=9 |
|-
|-  bgcolor="#CCFFCC"
| 2009-08-30 || Win ||align=left| Kang En || WCK World Championship Muay Thai, Las Vegas Hilton || Las Vegas, NV || TKO || 4 || 1:03
|-
! style=background:white colspan=9 |
|- 
|-  bgcolor="#CCFFCC"
| 2009-07-25 || Win ||align=left| Justin Greskiewicz || WCK World Championship Muay Thai, Las Vegas Hilton || Las Vegas, NV || TKO (High kick) || 3 || 1:49
|-
! style=background:white colspan=9 |
|-
|-  bgcolor="#FFBBBB"
| 2009-01-18 || Loss ||align=left| Kang En || Hero Legends || Beijing, China || Decision (Unanimous) || 3 || 3:00
|-
|-  bgcolor="#CCFFCC"
| 2008-08-29 || Win ||align=left| Rodolfo Arce || Gladiatores Extremos, Lydo's Showcenter || Zapopan, Jalisco, Mexico || Decision (Unanimous) || 5 || 3:00
|-
! style=background:white colspan=9 |
|-
|-  bgcolor="#CCFFCC"
| 2008-07-19 || Win ||align=left| Freddie Medrano || WCK: Full Rules Muay Thai, Pechanga Resort Casino || Temecula, CA || Decision (Split) || 4 || 3:00 
|-  bgcolor="#CCFFCC"
| 2008-05-31 || Win ||align=left| Travis Garlits || Xtreme Fighting Association II || Las Vegas, NV || Decision (Unanimous) || 3 || 3:00
|-  bgcolor="#FFBBBB"
| 2008-03-22 || Loss ||align=left| Mark Holst || Xtreme Fighting Association || Las Vegas, NV ||TKO || 1 || 0:58
|-   bgcolor="#FFBBBB"
| 2005-03-25 || Loss ||align=left| Romie Adanza || || Las Vegas, Nevada, US || Decision || 5 || 3:00
|-
| colspan=9 | Legend:

Mixed martial arts record

|-
|Loss
|align=center| 0-1
|Angelo Antuna
|Submission (Triangle Choke)
|Tuff-N-Uff 1
|
|align=center|1
|align=center|3:38
|Las Vegas, Nevada, United States
|

See also
 List of male kickboxers

References

External links 
 Interview with Sherdog
 Kevin Ross Video Highlights
 Kevin Ross Inside the Fight Team USA

1980 births
Living people
American male kickboxers
American male mixed martial artists
Mixed martial artists utilizing Muay Thai
Kickboxers from Nevada
Kickboxers from Pennsylvania
Lightweight kickboxers
American Muay Thai practitioners